Michael Victor Gaffney (born 30 November 1959) is an Australian politician. He has been an Independent member of the Tasmanian Legislative Council since 2009, representing the seat of Mersey.

Born in Devonport, Gaffney was trained as a teacher, and entered politics as a Latrobe councillor in 1994. In 2002, he became the Mayor, and was President of the Tasmanian Local Government Association from 2006. In 2002, he contested Braddon in the House of Assembly for Labor, but was unsuccessful. In 2009 he announced his candidacy for Mersey, which was being vacated by sitting independent Norma Jamieson.

References

1959 births
Living people
Members of the Tasmanian Legislative Council
Independent members of the Parliament of Tasmania
Australian schoolteachers
Tasmanian local councillors
University of Tasmania alumni
People from Devonport, Tasmania
21st-century Australian politicians